The 2011 Summit League baseball tournament took place from May 24 through 26. The top four regular season finishers of the league's seven teams met in the double-elimination tournament held at the City of Sioux Falls, South Dakota's Sioux Falls Stadium. Oral Roberts won their fourteenth consecutive championship, claiming the tournament title every year but one of the fifteenth seasons that they have been in the league, and represented The Summit League in the 2011 NCAA Division I baseball tournament.

Seeding
The top four finishers from the regular season will be seeded one through four.

Results

Most Valuable Player
Alex Gonzalez was named Tournament Most Valuable Player. Gonzalez played for Oral Roberts.

References

Tournament
Summit League Baseball Tournament
Summit League baseball tournament
Summit League baseball tournament